Valley View is an unincorporated community and a suburb of Chicago in St. Charles Township, Kane County, Illinois, United States. It is in between the cities of St. Charles and South Elgin. Valley View consists of new development on a narrow tract of land between IL-25 and a bend in the Fox River. In 2013, the population was 2,188.

References

Unincorporated communities in Kane County, Illinois
Unincorporated communities in Illinois